The Salvation Army Building is a historic building in Spokane, Washington. It was built in 1921, and designed by Archibald G. Rigg. It belonged to The Salvation Army until 1973. It has been listed on the National Register of Historic Places since November 22, 2000.

References

National Register of Historic Places in Spokane County, Washington
Early Commercial architecture in the United States
Buildings and structures completed in 1921
Salvation Army buildings